The 1st Critics' Choice Real TV Awards, presented by the Broadcast Television Journalists Association and NPACT, which recognizes excellence in nonfiction, unscripted and reality programming across broadcast, cable and streaming platforms, were held on June 2, 2019, at The Beverly Hilton in Los Angeles, California. The ceremony was streamed on VH1 on June 9. Loni Love served as the host of the ceremony.

Winners and nominees
Winners are highlighted in boldface:

Competition Series
RuPaul's Drag Race
Making It
Project Runway
Survivor: David vs. Goliath
Top Chef

Competition Series: Talent/Variety
The Masked Singer
America's Got Talent: The Champions
So You Think You Can Dance
The Voice
World of Dance

Unstructured Series
Born This Way
Deadliest Catch
Intervention
Many Sides of Jane
RuPaul's Drag Race: Untucked!

Structured Series
Queer Eye
Lip Sync Battle
Magic for Humans
Shark Tank
Tidying Up with Marie Kondo
Who Do You Think You Are?

Business Show
Shark Tank
Bar Rescue
Gordon Ramsay's 24 Hours to Hell and Back
Selling Sunset
T-Pain's School of Business

Sports Show
American Ninja Warrior
Losers
Real Sports with Bryant Gumbel
Sunderland 'Til I Die
Warriors of Liberty City

Crime/Justice Show
Conversations with a Killer: The Ted Bundy Tapes
Betrayed
In Pursuit with John Walsh
Making a Murderer: Part 2
The Innocent Man

Ongoing Documentary Series
POV
Chef's Table
The Circus: Inside the Wildest Political Show on Earth
United Shades of America
Vice

Limited Documentary Series
Surviving R. Kelly
Conversations with a Killer: The Ted Bundy Tapes
Our Planet
Punk
Shut Up and Dribble

Short Form Series
Carpool Karaoke: The Series
9 Months with Courteney Cox
Biography Presents: History, Herstory
Comeback Kids
The Daily Show with Trevor Noah: Between the Scenes

Live Show
The Voice
BUILD
La Voz
So You Think You Can Dance
Yellowstone Live

Interactive Show
Watch What Happens Live with Andy Cohen
Talking Dead
You vs. Wild

Talk Show
My Next Guest Needs No Introduction with David Letterman
Comedians in Cars Getting Coffee
Red Table Talk
The Ellen DeGeneres Show
The View

Late-Night Talk Show
Last Week Tonight with John Oliver
The Late Late Show with James Corden
Full Frontal with Samantha Bee
The Daily Show with Trevor Noah
The Late Show with Stephen Colbert

Entertainment News Show
Entertainment Tonight 
Access
E! News
Extra
Inside Edition

Culinary Show
The Great British Baking Show
Chopped
Nailed It!
Salt Fat Acid Heat
Top Chef

Game Show
Jeopardy!
Cash Cab
Common Knowledge
Ellen's Game of Games
Hollywood Game Night

Travel/Adventure Show
The Great Food Truck Race
Expedition Unknown
Larry Charles' Dangerous World of Comedy
Somebody Feed Phil
The Voyager with Josh Garcia

Animal/Nature Show
Our Planet
Amanda to the Rescue
Dodo Heroes
Dynasties
Hostile Planet

Lifestyle Show: Fashion/Beauty
Queer Eye
Project Runway
Project Runway All-Stars
Say Yes to the Dress

Relationship Show
Dating Around
Married at First Sight
Born This Way
The Bachelor
Wife Swap

Lifestyle Show: Home/Garden
Property Brothers
Home Town
Love It or List It
Tidying Up with Marie Kondo
Trading Spaces

Ensemble Cast in an Unscripted Series
Queer Eye
Crikey! It's The Irwins
RuPaul's Drag Race
The Real Housewives of New York City
Trading Spaces

Show Host
James Corden – The Late Late Show with James Corden
RuPaul Charles – RuPaul's Drag Race
Stephen Colbert – The Late Show with Stephen Colbert
Busy Philipps – Busy Tonight
Jerry Seinfeld – Comedians in Cars Getting Coffee

Female Star of The Year
Sandra Lee – Dr. Pimple Popper
Nicole Byer – Nailed It!
Marie Kondo – Tidying Up With Marie Kondo
Samin Nosrat – Salt Fat Acid Heat
Chrissy Teigen – Lip Sync Battle
Michelle Visage – RuPaul's Drag Race

Male Star of The Year
Jonathan Van Ness – Queer Eye
David Attenborough – Our Planet
RuPaul Charles – RuPaul's Drag Race
Hasan Minhaj – Patriot Act with Hasan Minhaj
Phil Rosenthal – Somebody Feed Phil

Outstanding Achievement in Nonfiction by a Network or Streaming Platform
Netflix
A&E
Bravo
FOX
Investigation Discovery
NBC

Outstanding Achievement in Nonfiction Production
Kreativ Inc.
A. Smith & Co. Productions
Big Fish Entertainment
Endemol Shine North America
The Intellectual Property Corporation (IPC)

Shows with multiple wins
The following shows received multiple awards:

References

2019 television awards
2019 in American television
 001
June 2019 events in the United States
2019 in Los Angeles